KLGW (98.5 FM, "K-Love") is a radio station broadcasting a Contemporary Christian format. Licensed to Grand Coulee, Washington, United States, the station is currently owned by Educational Media Foundation.

On June 29, 2020, Wheeler Broadcasting, Inc. and Resort Radio, LLC entered into a management and programming agreement, with Resort Radio, LLC to begin operating the-then-KEYG-FM & KEYG beginning on July 1. On July 1, KEYG-FM flipped to a simulcast of oldies station KCSY "Sunny FM", giving Sunny FM coverage all across Eastern Washington.

In June 2022, the Wheeler Family sold KEYG-FM to Educational Media Foundation. The sale, at a price of $150,000, was consummated on November 15, 2022. The station switched to EMF's K-Love contemporary Christian format and then changed its call sign to KLGW on November 22, 2022.

Previous logo
(used from ?-2020)

References

External links

Mass media in Grant County, Washington
Radio stations established in 1987
LGW
1987 establishments in Washington (state)
Educational Media Foundation radio stations
Contemporary Christian radio stations in the United States